The 2009–10 season was the 85th season in the history of Fussball-Club Luzern and the club's fourth consecutive season in the top flight of Swiss football.

Players

First-team squad

Transfers

Pre-season and friendlies

Competitions

Overall record

Swiss Super League

League table

Results summary

Results by round

Matches

Swiss Cup

References

FC Luzern seasons
Luzern